Hankerson is a surname. Notable people with the surname include:

Barry Hankerson (born 1946), American record producer
Hilda M. Hankerson (born 1956), American basketball coach
Leonard Hankerson (born 1989), American football player